Yozefu Mayanja (born 30 April 1979), better known by the stage name Jose Chameleone, is a Ugandan AfroBeat artist and musician. Chameleone sings in Luganda, English and Swahili.

He started his music career in  1998 in Kenya with the Ogopa Deejays, a Kenyan record label then. Chameleone's music style is a mixture of Ugandan folk, central African rumba, zouk, and   reggae.

Early life and education 
Joseph Mayanja was born to Gerald and Prossy Mayanja on 30 April 1979 in Kampala district. He is 4th out of 8 children. He went to Nakasero Primary School, Mengo Senior Secondary School, Kawempe Muslim Senior Secondary School, Katikamu Seventh Day Adventist Senior Secondary School, and Progressive Senior Secondary School. He is also recognised for the composition of Kawempe Muslim Secondary School anthem.

Musical career

Chameleone's career began in 1996 as a DJ at the Missouri night club in Kampala. Later he moved to Kenya where he got signed to the Kenyan record label Ogopa Deejays, which released his first single, "Bageya" that featured Kenyan artist Redsan. Throughout the years he has had record selling albums locally like Mama Mia, Mambo Bado, Jamila, Kipepeo, Bageya, Shida za Dunia, Bayuda, and Njo Karibu. Although his music is popular all over the African continent, the majority of his fans/listeners are mainly from the central part of Africa (Democratic Republic of Congo, Rwanda, Burundi, Kenya, Uganda and Tanzania).

Albums 
Jose Chameleone released his first album in 2000 and by 2013, he has released a total of 13 albums. Some of them include Kipepeo, Shida za dunia, Valu valu, Bayuda, Badilisha, Sweet Banana and Champion. Some of his hit songs include "Valu valu", "Jamila", "Shida za dunia", Bayuda, "Tatizo", "Nkwagala nyo", "Kipepeo", "Dorotia" and "Kipepeo". He performed to the largest audience at the Lugogo Cricket Oval Stadium in Kampala.

Bageya, was released in 2000, Mama Mia in 2001, Njo Karibu and The Golden Voice in 2003, Mambo Bado in 2004, Kipepeo in 2005, Shida za Dunia in 2006, Sivyo Ndivyo and Katupakase in 2007, Bayuda in 2009, Vumilia in 2010, Valu Valu in 2012, Badilisha in 2013, Tubonge in 2014, Wale wale in 2015, Sili Mujjawo in 2016, Sweet Banana in 2017, Champion in 2018.

Music label 
He is the CEO (chief Executive Officer )of the music label known as Leone Island. Several Artistes have been associated with this label. They include: the late Mosey Radio, Weasel, the late AK 47, King Saha, Papa Cidy, and Pallaso, Melody, Yung Mulo and Big Eye.

Other activities
The former speaker of the parliament of Uganda, Rebecca Kadaga, designated Chameleone to be the Ambassador of the Busoga Tourism Initiative. He also Directs Chameleone Foundation aimed at improving skills and talent amongst under opportunitied youths 

Chameleone is a member of a coalition of musicians who use their fame and fortune to help reduce poverty and create awareness campaigns for HIV/AIDS.

He has performed overseas including in the United States, the United Kingdom, Sweden, Belgium, Malaysia, China, South Africa, the Democratic Republic of the Congo, Zambia, Malawi, South Sudan, Germany, and Switzerland, among others.

Chameleone was gifted a new Toyota V8 in 2020 by Achai Wiir.

Personal life
Chameleone is married to Danielle Atim. The couple has five children namely Abba Marcus Mayanja, Alfa Joseph Mayanja, Alba Shyne Mayanja, Amma Christian Mayanja and Xara Amani Mayanja studying and living in the United States.

He ran for office as Lord Mayor of Kampala in 2021.

Concerts 
In February 2023, musician Chameleone held a successful concert titled 'Gwanga Mujje,' which translates to 'let the whole nation attend.' The event took place at Lugogo Cricket Oval in Kampala, Uganda. Originally planned for an earlier date, the concert was postponed due to heavy rain and rescheduled for February 24, 2023.

In addition, Chameleone organized a sold-out charity event called 'One Man, One Million' at Victoria Hall in Kampala. The event was endorsed by the first lady of Uganda, Janet Museveni, and attendees were required to pay one million Ugandan Shillings to attend.

Discography

Albums

Singles
(selected)

"Wale Wale"
"Valu Valu"
"Tubonge"
"Badilisha"
"Kiggwa Leero"
"Mateeka"
"Champion"
"Bayuda"
"Kiboko Fire"
"Hannah"
"Bomboclat"
"Jamila"
"Dorotia"
"Nkoleki"
"All Di Girls"
"Relaxing"
"Going On"
"Moto Moto"
"Africa Kiboko Yao"
"Bei Kali"
"Mama Rhoda"
"Ndivyo Sivyo"
"Only You"
"Mama Mia"
"Bwerere"
"Meeme Katale"
"Naumia"
"Nekolela Mali"
"Shida Za Dunia"
"Forever"
"Basiima Ogenze"
"Gimme Gimme"
"Owakabi"

Awards

Won
 2004 Pearl of Africa Music Awards (PAM Awards) – Artiste of the Year & Song of the Year ("Jamila")
 2005 Pearl of Africa Music Awards (PAM Awards) – Best Afro Beat Artiste/Group & Best Afro Beat Single ("Kipepeo")
 2004 Tanzania Music Awards – Best East African Album ("Bei Kali")
 2005 Tanzania Music Awards – Best East African Album ("Jamila")
 2006 Pearl of Africa Music Awards (PAM Awards) –  Best Afro Beat Artiste/Group
 2006 Kisima Music Awards – Best Ugandan Song (Mama Rhoda) & Best Ugandan Music Video (Mama Rhoda)
 2007 Kisima Music Awards – Best Ugandan Song (Sivyo Ndiviyo with Professor Jay)
 2014 HiPipo Music Awards  – Song of the Year "Badilisha"
 2013 African Entertainment Awards – International Best Male Artist
 2014 HiPipo Music Awards  – Best Male ZOUK Song "Badilisha"
 2015 All Africa Music Awards (AFRIMA) – Song Writer of the Year
2018 Galaxy Zzina Music Awards – Legend Award

Nominated
 2003 Kora Awards – Best East Africa Artist
 2004 Kora Awards – Best East African Male Artist
 2006 MOBO Awards – Best African Act
 2007 MTV Europe Music Awards – Best African Act
 2012 Tanzania Music Awards – Best East African Song (Valu Valu)
 2014 World Music Awards (three categories) – World Best Male Artist, World Best Live Act & World Best Performer
 2015 MTV Africa Music Awards – MAMA Evolution Award

References 

21st-century Ugandan male singers
Kisima Music Award winners
1979 births
Living people
20th-century Ugandan male singers